Orstenoloricus is a loriciferan larva, presumably from the stem group, preserved by early three-dimensional mineralization in an orsten-type setting in the mid-Cambrian of Australia. It somewhat resembles the larva of the unusual loriciferan Tenuiloricus.

References

Loricifera
Fossil taxa described in 2009